The Boy in the Bush is a novel by D. H. Lawrence set in Western Australia, first published in 1924. It is derived from a story in a manuscript given to Lawrence by Mollie Skinner, entitled The House of Ellis. The title page of the first edition gives "D. H. Lawrence and M. L. Skinner" equal billing as its authors. Lawrence and his wife Frieda stayed with Skinner at her guesthouse in Darlington, Western Australia in 1922.

Australian television production 

The Boy in the Bush was made into a television miniseries in 1984, directed by Rob Stewart and starring Kenneth Branagh and Sigrid Thornton.

It was one of five co-productions between the ABC and Portman Productions.

Standard edition

References

External links 
 
The Boy in the Bush at middlemiss.org

Novels by D. H. Lawrence
1924 British novels
English novels
Novels set in Western Australia